Scobbie is a surname. Notable people with the surname include:

 Iain Scobbie, British expert in international law
 Tam Scobbie (born 1988), Scottish footballer

See also
 Scobie